Ground Level was an Australian-based electronic music performance and production duo: David John Walker (Melbourne, Victoria, Australia) and Jean-Marie Guilfoil (Madison, Wisconsin, United States). Their single, "Dreams of Heaven" was an underground dance club release which peaked at No. 54 on the mainstream UK Singles Chart in January 1993. They released an album, New Moon in 1995.

Background
Ground Level formed in Melbourne as the electronic duo of David John Walker and Jean-Marie Guilfoil. In 1990, they issued their first single, "Deputy of Love", as a 12" three-track under the name, Ground Level featuring D J Walker, on an independent label. By 1992, they had signed with Vicious Vinyl and released "God Intended" in January, which was written and produced by Walker. "Out of Body" appeared in June, followed by Ground Level's fourth single, "Dreams of Heaven", which peaked at No. 54 on the UK Singles Chart in January 1993. According to Vicious Vinyl label owner, Andy Van (aka Andy Van Dorsselaer see Madison Avenue), the single was one of their biggest successes "[it] was a very, very big hit. It got to No. 3 on the dance charts in the UK."

The group released six singles and an album, New Moon (1995), through Vicious Vinyl in Australia. Their singles were released in the UK and Europe through Faze 2 on the Pulse 8 record label, Intercord Tontrager GmbH (merged with the EMI Electrola roster in 2000) and Sonic Records, part of Instinct Records. Ground Level's singles also appeared on compilation albums in Europe, Japan, and the United States, where "God Intended" was featured on Sonic Records' Killer Techno US compilation. Their sixth single, "Searching for the Truth" was performed with co-writer John Kenny (ex-Rockmelons).

Discography

Singles
 "Deputy of Love" (1990) Independent vinyl release
 "God Intended" (1992)
 "Out of Body" (1992)
 "Dreams of Heaven" (1992)
 "As We Journey" featuring Lisa Maxwell / "Lucid" (1993)
 "Searching for the Truth" featuring John Kenny (ex-Rockmelons) (1995)
 "Pray" (1996)

Album 
New Moon (1995), Vicious Vinyl VVLP003CD

Personnel
Jean-Marie Guilfoil – performer, producer
David Walker – performer, producer
David Briggs – mastering (tracks 1, 3, 5, 6, 7) at The Production Workshop
Tony Espie – engineer (tracks 2, 4, 7, 9, 10) at EMI 301 studios
Lisa Maxwell – vocals (track 8)
John Kenny – vocals (track 10)

References

External links
Discogs Ground Level Releases

Australian pop music groups
Australian electronic music groups
Male–female musical duos
Australian musical duos
Victoria (Australia) musical groups
Musical groups established in 1990